Ramkola is a constituency of the Uttar Pradesh Legislative Assembly covering the city of Ramkola in the Kushinagar district of Uttar Pradesh, India.

Ramkola is one of five assembly constituencies in the Kushi Nagar Lok Sabha constituency. Since 2008, this assembly constituency is numbered 335 amongst 403 constituencies.

Election results

2022

2017
Suheldev Bharatiya Samaj Party candidate Ramanand Baudh won in last Assembly election of 2017 Uttar Pradesh Legislative Elections defeating Samajwadi Party candidate Purnmasi Dehati by a margin of 55,729 votes.

Members of Legislative Assembly

References

External links
 

Assembly constituencies of Uttar Pradesh
Kushinagar district